"Queen of the New Year" is the fifth and final single from the album When the World Knows Your Name by the Scottish pop rock band Deacon Blue.

It reached No. 21 in the UK Singles Chart, but went as high as No. 4 in the Irish Singles Chart, the group's fifth Irish top 10 hit in a row.

The main B-side is "My America".  Some versions of the single contain the additional B-side, "Las Vegas", along with a longer version of the album track "Sad Loved Girl" and an acoustic demo version of the album track "Circus Lights".

As with the previous single, "Love and Regret", a limited edition four track live EP single was also released, this time in 12" vinyl and CD formats.

Track listing
All songs written by Ricky Ross, except where noted:

7" single  (Deac 11)
 "Queen of the New Year" (Ross, Prime) – 3:36
 "My America" – 3:10

7" gatefold EP single  (Deac ep11)
 "Queen of the New Year" (Ross, Prime) – 3:36
 "My America" – 3:10
 "Sad Loved Girl (Long Version)" – 3:17
 "Las Vegas" – 3:55

12" single  (Deac t11)
 "Queen of the New Year (Extended Mix)" (Ross, Prime) – 5:47
 "My America" – 3:10
 "Circus Lights (Acoustic Version)" – 2:56

Cassette single  (Deac m11)
 "Queen of the New Year" (Ross, Prime) – 3:36
 "My America" – 3:10

3" CD single  (655525 3)
 "Queen of the New Year (Extended Mix)" (Ross, Prime) – 5:47
 "My America" – 3:10
 "Queen of the New Year" (Ross, Prime) – 3:36
 "Circus Lights (Acoustic Version)" – 2:56

CD single  (CDDeac 11)
 "Queen of the New Year" (Ross, Prime) – 3:36
 "My America" – 3:10
 "Sad Loved Girl (Long Version)" – 3:17
 "Las Vegas" – 3:55

Limited edition live EP

References

Deacon Blue songs
1989 singles
Songs written by Ricky Ross (musician)
1989 songs
Columbia Records singles